Thomas Sarsfield Gallery (November 27, 1897 – August 25, 1993) was an American film actor. He appeared in 21 films between 1920 and 1927 and was married to actress ZaSu Pitts. Subsequently, he became a successful sports promoter.

Selected filmography

 Dinty (1920)
 The Chorus Girl's Romance (1920)
 A Parisian Scandal (1921)
 The Son of Wallingford (1921)
 Home Stuff (1921)
 Patsy (1921)
 Bob Hampton of Placer (1921)
 Grand Larceny (1922)
 The Wall Flower (1922)
 A Daughter of Luxury (1922)
 The Eternal Three (1923)
 Itching Palms (1923) directed by James W. Horne
 The Limited Mail (1925)
 Under the Rouge (1925)
 One Round Hogan (1927)
 Home Struck (1927)
 A Dog of the Regiment (1927)

References

External links

Tom Gallery at Silent Era

1897 births
1993 deaths
20th-century American male actors
American male film actors
Male actors from Chicago